Gamsakhurdia is a Georgian surname, formerly of a petite noble family, hailing from the province of Samegrelo. It may refer to:
 Giorgi Gamsakhurdia, major-general in Imperial Russian army
 Sergey Gamsakhurdia, major-general in Imperial Russian army
 Konstantine Gamsakhurdia (1893–1975), Georgian novelist, father of Zviad Gamsakhurdia
 Zviad Gamsakhurdia (1939–1993), Georgian politician, first President of Georgia, son of the writer Konstantine Gamsakhurdia
 Konstantine Gamsakhurdia (politician) (born 1961), Georgian politician, eldest son of Zviad Gamsakhurdia
 Tsotne Gamsakhurdia, the second son of Zviad Gamsakhurdia
 Giorgi Gamsakhurdia, Georgian government official, the youngest son of Zviad Gamsakhurdia
 Roman Gamsakhurdia, circus manager in Georgia and Russia

Noble families of Georgia (country)
Georgian-language surnames